The Burned Barns is a 1973 French drama film directed by Jean Chapot. The fim score was composed by Jean Michel Jarre and released as album in 1973. In 2003, the soundtrack album was reissued on CD by Disques Dreyfus.

Cast
 Simone Signoret - Rose Cateux
 Alain Delon - Pierre Larcher
 Paul Crauchet - Pierre Cateux
 Bernard Le Coq - Paul Cateux
 Pierre Rousseau - Louis Cateux
 Catherine Allégret - Françoise Cateux
 Miou-Miou - Monique Cateux
 Béatrice Costantini - Lucile Cateux
 Jean Bouise - Reporter
 Renato Salvatori - hôtelier

References

External links
 

1973 drama films
1973 films
French drama films
1970s French-language films
1970s French films